George Rolle (c. 1486 – 20 November 1552) of Stevenstone in the parish of St Giles in the Wood near Great Torrington in Devon, was the founder of the wealthy, influential and widespread Rolle family of Devon, which according to the Return of Owners of Land, 1873 in the person of Hon. Mark Rolle (died 1907), the adoptive heir of John Rolle, 1st Baron Rolle (died 1842), had become by that year the largest landowner in Devon with about 55,000 acres. He was a  Dorset-born London lawyer who in 1507 became Keeper of the Records of the  Court of Common Pleas and was elected as a Member of Parliament for Barnstaple in 1542 and 1545. He became the steward of Dunkeswell Abbey in Devon, and following the Dissolution of the Monasteries he purchased much ex-monastic land in Devon. Not only was he the founder of his own great Devonshire landowning dynasty but he was also an ancestor of others almost as great, including the Acland baronets of Killerton, the Wrey Baronets of Tawstock and the Trefusis family of Trefusis in Cornwall now of Heanton Satchville, Huish, later Baron Clinton, heirs both of Rolle of Heanton Satchville, Petrockstowe and of Rolle of Stevenstone.

Origins
George Rolle's place of birth is unknown, but he is known to have been related to Thomas Rolle (died 1525) who had been born at Wimborne Minster in Dorset  and whose uncle was William Rolle, parson of Witchampton in Dorset.  Both George Rolle and William Rolle were  joint-remaindermen in the will of  Thomas Rolle (died 1525).

Career
The place of his education and legal training is unknown, but by 1507 he had become Keeper of the Records of the Court of Common Pleas, of which office  in 1523 by means of a private Act of Parliament which mentioned his "long, good and perfect knowledge and experience" he acquired a life tenure. His patron during his early legal career appears to have been Sir Robert Brudenell (1461–1531), Chief Justice of the Common Pleas from 1521. In 1545 he became a JP for Devon and the bailiff of the Hundred of Stratton in Cornwall, part of the Duchy of Cornwall.

Work for Viscount Lisle

He gained many prominent private clients including  Arthur Plantagenet, 1st Viscount Lisle (died 1542) whom he served until the latter's death, and whose wife Honor Grenville was from North Devon and whose Devonshire home was at Umberleigh (the seat of her first husband Sir John Basset (1462–1529)) not far from Stevenstone. He recruited to Lisle's assistance, especially in his purchase of Frithelstock Priory,  Richard Pollard (died 1542), General Surveyor of the Court of Augmentations, his fellow North Devonian lawyer and speculator in monastic lands. He wrote from London to Lady Lisle on 22 December 1536: "I have sued with your...servant Husee, who right diligently doth apply your business here, to the Chancellor of Augmentations with whom I have often been about the same, and have at this day appointed you the best and most profitable lands belonging to the said late priory, with much pain and suit, wherein we have found Mr Chancellor of Augmentations and Mr Onley both good, which have both deserved your thanks". He had just received his wish from the Lisles of being appointed their surveyor and receiver of the lands of Frithelstock Priory, which required him to collect rent money from all the tenants on their behalves. The Rolle family's voracious appetite and great skill for amassing Devon property later saw Frithelstock Priory become one of their own estates. He was much involved in the legal affairs of Lisle's wife's dower manor of Umberleigh and in the protracted legal struggle to obtain the Beaumont inheritance due to her eldest son John Basset (1518–1541), by her first husband John Basset (1462–1528) of Umberleigh. His letter to Lady Lisle dated 25 July 1534 includes the line "Madame, also your ladyship doth know that I bought your images and scripture for Mr Basset and for that I am now paid", which refers to the still surviving monumental brasses on the tomb of her first husband in Atherington Church. Thirteen of Rolle's autograph letters survive in the Lisle Letters, some written from London and a few signed "from my poor house of Stevenstone". Two of Rolle's granddaughters were named Honor, apparently after Lady Lisle and his second son George Rolle married the daughter of Lady Lisle's step-daughter Margery Marrys, (née Basset).

Surviving correspondence

Thirteen letters written by George Rolle survive in the Lisle Letters of which the following to Lady Lisle dated 28 February 1539 is an example, mainly dealing with the disputed Beaumont-Basset inheritance:
"Right honourable and my singular good lady, my duty remembered, I have me humbly recommended unto your good ladyship and to my good Lord Lyle advertising your ladyship that I received your ladyship's letter by which ye willed me to speak with my Lady Coffyn for her title in East Haggynton in the county of Devon who had one estate in tail to him and to his heirs of her body begotten; and now he is dead without issue of his body so that the reversion should revert to Mr John Basset and to his heirs so there be no let nor discontinuance of the same made by Sir William Coffyn in his life. Howbeit Mr Richard Coffyn, next heir to Sir William Coffyn, claimeth the same by his uncle's feoffment to him and to his heirs so that the law will put Mr John Basset from his entry and to compel him to take his action of form down which is much dilatory as Mr Basset knoweth albeit I intend to sue unto one writ of diem clausit extremum after the death of the said Sir William and so to find Mr Basset's title if we may come and attain any evidence, when we come home, of John Davy, to enforce the same which will cost v marks at least. But the best way when Mr Harys and I meet shall be taken. My Lady Coffyn is in Leicestershire so that I could not speak with her in this matter. And if my lord or your ladyship will command me any service into the country I (God willing) intend to ride the viii th day of March next coming and shall be glad to accomplish the same to the utterest of my power as knoweth our Lord who preserve you both in honour long to endure. Ffrom London the last day of Ffebruary, by your assuryd servant George Rolle".

Lands and assets acquired
The following lands in Devon were amongst those acquired by George Rolle:
Stevenstone in the parish of St Giles in the Wood near the town of Great Torrington in Devon, which he made his principal seat, and which long remained that of his descendants. Rolle's contemporary the antiquarian John Leland (died 1552) noted at this place his "fair brick building", uncommon at the time in Devon. Rolle's work in the Court of Common Pleas brought him into contact with Sir Lewis Pollard (c. 1465 – 1526), lord of the manor of King's Nympton in Devon, a Justice of the Common Pleas from 1514 to 1526 and Member of Parliament for Totnes in 1491. The Pollard family were first established in Devon before the 13th century at the manor of Way in the parish of St Giles in the Wood, where Sir Lewis Pollard's father had been born and where his senior first cousin still lived. It was Pollard's eldest son, Sir Hugh Pollard (fl.1535,1545), of King's Nympton, Sheriff of Devon in 1535/6, who in his capacity as Recorder of Barnstaple in 1545, nominated Rolle to one of the parliamentary seats of the Borough of Barnstaple. Stevenstone eventually at the start of the 20th century became the caput of "the largest estate Devon had ever seen", when held by the eventual heir of the two main branches of the Rolle family, Charles John Robert Hepburn-Stuart-Forbes-Trefusis, 21st Baron Clinton (1863–1957), today managed by the Clinton Devon Estates company. 
Buckland Brewer, which manor, termed a "barony" although not generally recognised as having been an ancient feudal barony, he purchased in 1544.
In 1545 in partnership with Nicholas Adams (died 1557/84), MP, of Combe, Dartmouth, one of the Commissioners for the suppression of chantries in Devon. and whose wife Cicely Fulford was 1st cousin of Sir John Chichester (died 1569) of Raleigh, Pilton, he purchased lands in south Devon worth £720, including the manor of Townstall, later the seat of Adams.
Pilton Priory, near Barnstaple, of which he acquired a large part after the Dissolution. On 6 August 1544 in partnership with the Lincoln's Inn lawyer George Haydon (c. 1517 – 1558), co-MP with Rolle for Barnstaple in 1545, he acquired the Priory's agricultural estates in the parishes of Parracombe, Ilfracombe, Ashford, Pilton, Marwood, North Molton, Goodleigh and Okeford, amounting in total annual value to £9 6s 9d and 26 capons. On 28 September 1545 in partnership with Nicholas Adams (died 1557/84) he acquired properties formerly leased from the Crown by  Richard Duke (died 1572), the first post-Dissolution holder, comprising several small tenements, cottages and plots of land of Pilton Priory, to a total annual value of £16 6s 0d. He disposed of parts immediately in 1545, at much inflated prices, including Littabourne, mostly to the occupying tenants. Adams was one of the Commissioners for the suppression of the chantries in Devon and Cornwall established in 1546 and Haydon was a member of the same body re-founded in 1548.
Wardship in 1526 of the minor Hugh Culme (died 1545) of Molland-Champson
Wardship of Margaret Marrys, daughter and sole heiress of William Marrys of "Marrys", i.e. Marhayes Manor, Week St Mary, Cornwall, whose marriage he bequeathed in his will to his son George Rolle.
Properties in Borough of Barnstaple.
Buckfast Place (alias the "Abbot's Lodge"), Cathedral Close, in the parish of St Martin, Exeter. His townhouse, where he died, comprising "messuage, garden and curtilage". It was held from the crown in burgage, worth 30 shillings. This house, later known as the "Abbot's Lodge", was destroyed in 1942 during World War II bombing. It had been the townhouse of the Abbot of Buckfast Abbey, which Abbey and much of its lands, apparently excluding the Abbot's Lodge, had been acquired following the Dissolution of the Monasteries by Sir Thomas Denys (c. 1477 – 1561) of Holcombe Burnell, whose eventual heir was the Rolle family. In 1545 following the Dissolution of the Monasteries George Rolle had acquired "Buckfast House", later known as the Abbot's Lodge, where he died in 1552. The house remained the Rolle townhouse until its sale in 1737. Sir Henry Rolle (1545–1625) of Stevenstone made alterations to the Abbot's Lodge and added decorative heraldic plaster escutcheons dated 1602, one of which showed Rolle impaling Watts of six quarters the other Rolle impaling Fortescue, for his first and second wives respectively.<ref>Devon Notes & Queries, Vol.9, 1916-17, pp. 97–9: Armorial Bearings at the Abbot's Lodge", The Close, Exeter"</ref> In 1669 Sir John Rolle (1626–1706) entertained the Grand Duke of Tuscany at the Abbot's Lodge.

Marriages
George Rolle married three times:
Elizabeth Ashton, of unknown origin, who died before 1522.
Eleanor's sister Anne Dacres was the wife of Sir John Pakington (died 1551), MP, of Hampton Lovett, Worcestershire, and her other sister Alice Dacres was the wife of Robert Cheseman (died 1547), MP for Middlesex. Henry Dacres' monumental brass exists in St Dunstan's Church in the West, City of London, showing two brass kneeling figures, male and female, with labels protruding from their mouths. Beneath them is the following inscription: "Here lyeth buryed the body of Henry Dacres, Cetezen and Marchant Taylor and sumtyme Alderman of London, and Elizabeth his wyffe, the whych Henry decessed the ? day of ? the yere of our Lord God ? and the said Elizabeth decessed the xxiii day of Apryll the yere of our Lord God Mdc and xxx."
Margery, of unknown family, whom he married before 23 June 1551 as her third husband, the widow of Henry Brinklow and Stephen Vaughan, both of London. She remarried to Sir Leonard Chamberlain (died 1561), MP for Oxfordshire in 1554.

Children

By his second wife Eleanor Dacres, George Rolle had children including the following:
John Rolle (1522–1570) of Stevenstone, eldest son, who married Margaret Ford, daughter of John Ford of Ashburton. His small monumental brass survives now affixed by modern screws into the floor of the south aisle of St Giles in the Wood parish Church, beneath the separate brass figure of his wife, but formerly affixed to his two and a half foot high chest tomb situated in the chancel of that church as recorded by Prince in his 1710 work "Worthies of Devon". It is inscribed in Latin thus: "Hic jacet Joh(ann)es Rolle, Ar(miger), quonda(m) domin(u)s de Stevinstone qui obiit 12.o (duodecimo) die Augusti Anno D(omi)ni 1570" ("Here lies John Rolle, Esquire, sometime lord of Stevenstone who died on the 12th day of August in the year of Our Lord 1570"). The arms show Rolle impaling Party per fesse argent (or azure) and sable, in chief a greyhound current in base an owl within a bordure engrailed all counter-changed"'' (Ford)
George Rolle (died 1573), married Margaret Marrys, daughter and sole heir of William Marrys of "Marrys", i.e. Marhayes Manor, Week St Mary, Cornwall. The wardship of Margaret Marrys had been acquired by George Rolle who in his will left her wardship to his son George, who therefore chose to marry her himself. Margaret Marrys' mother was Margery (or Mary) Basset, a daughter of Sir John Basset (1462–1528) by his first wife Elizabeth Denys, and was thus Lady Lisle's step-daughter. The manor of Marrys was adjacent to the Basset manor of Femarshall, part of which Margery had as her dower. George Rolle named one of his daughters Honor, apparently after Lady Lisle, as his elder brother John Rolle had done for one of his daughters also.
Henry Rolle, who married Margaret Yeo, daughter and sole heiress of Robert Yeo of Heanton Satchville, Petrockstowe by his wife Mary Fortescue, daughter of Bartholomew Fortescue of Filleigh.
Jacquetta Rolle, who married Richard Gilbert. She received a grant of her late father's goods after the death of her brother George in 1573.
Elizabeth Rolle, who married twice: firstly to Robert Mallet, of Woolleigh near Great Torrington. Her daughter and the eventual heiress of Woolleigh was Eleanor Mallet (1573–1645), the mother of Sir John Acland, 1st Baronet (1591–1647) of Acland, Landkey and of Columb John, which family (later of Killerton) went on to become one of the greatest landowning dynasties in Devon and the Southwest, almost equalling the Rolles. Secondly, as his first wife, she married Sir John Acland (died 1620) of Columb John, Broadclyst, Devon, whose great nephew and heir was Sir John Acland, 1st Baronet (1591–1647). A small kneeling figure representing Elizabeth Rolle survives on the monument with effigy to her 2nd husband in St John's Church, Broadclyst.
Maria Rolle, died childless. She married James Dalton (died 1601), MP.
Maurice Rolle, who married Margaret Brier. They were the patrilineal great-great grandpartents of Edward Rolle.

Death and burial
He died at his Exeter townhouse Buckfast Place, in the parish of St Martin, on 20 November 1552, nine days after having signed his will  dated 11 November 1552. He requested to be buried "in such place as he should die at", which remains unknown.

Will
Collins Peerage of England quotes from his will as follows: 
"He therein bequeaths his soul to the Holy Trinity, and all the holy company of saints, and his body to be buried in such place, where he shall depart this miserable life, in such manner as shall please Margery his wife, whom he makes his sole executrix. He bequeaths to Jackit Rolle, Besse Rolle, and Mary Rolle, his daughters, 600 marks each, to be received and paid by his trusty servants and friends, John Wychalf, Geffery Tuthyll, Richard Staveley, and John Thore, or any two of them, out of all his manors, lands, etc. in the counties of Devon, Somerset and Cornwall, accounting to his wife once in the year whilst she lives, within one month after the feast of St. Michael. He grants and bequeaths to George, his son, the wardship and marriage of Margaret Marrys, daughter and sole heir to Edmund Marrys, of the parish of St Mary Wyke in the county of Cornwall, in as ample manner as he had of the gift and grant of the said Edmund Marrys, paying yearly to the said Edmund £ ? during his life. The residue of his goods, etc., he bequeaths to Margery his wife, his sole executrix. He bequeaths to his daughter, (?)Mary Rolle, two tenements in Wandsworth, with the appurtenances; and if she die unmarried, then to his daughter, Elizabeth Rolle, and her heirs. He also bequeathed to his daughter Mary, a basin and ewer, engraved with her mother's arms; and if she died unmarried, then to his daughter, Elizabeth Rolle. And whereas his late brother-in-law, Sir John Pakington, by the name of John Pakington, of Hampton-Lovet in the county of Worcester, Esq. by writing obligatory, dated February 15th, in 28 Hen. VIII. became bounden to him, the said George Rolle, and to Harry Dacres, merchant of London, and others, now deceased, on condition that the said Sir John Pakington, cause to be made 'to Edmund Knightley, serjeant at law, the said George Rolle, and others, a sufficient estate of, and in manors, lands, &c. in the shires of Worcester, Hereford, Stafford, Salop, and Middlesex, or any of them, to the clear yearly value of 120/. over and above all charges, &c. whereof the manor of Chadsley Corbet, with the appurtenances, in Worcestershire, should be parcel; to hold to the said John Pakington, and Anne, for term of the life of the said Anne, and to the heir male of the body of the said Sir John Pakington. His will is, that William Sheldon, of the county of Worcester, Esq. and John Prydyaux, Gent, shall be his executors for the said writing, and be governed in all and every suit, for the recovery of the debt contained in the said obligation, by his dear and well-beloved sister-in law, dame Anne Pakington, widow, for whose security the said obligation was made".

Notes

References

External links
Will of George Rolle of Stevenstone, Devon, proved 9 February 1553, National Archives Retrieved 5 May 2013

George
English MPs 1542–1544
English MPs 1545–1547
Members of the Parliament of England (pre-1707) for Barnstaple
People from Great Torrington
1480s births
1552 deaths